Erich Rothacker (12 March 1888 – 11 August 1965) was a German philosopher, a leading exponent of philosophical anthropology.

Rothacker's first major work, Logik und Systematik der Geisteswissenschaften (Logic of the Human Sciences, 1920), presents the view that actual historical individuals, whose cognitive equipment is partially created by a specific cultural community while at the same time constantly modifying it, are the elements that constitute the subject of knowledge, rather than a timeless universal entity as it is represented by Descartes or Locke.

Works 
 Einleitung in die Geisteswissenschaften (1920)
 Logik und Systematik der Geisteswissenschaften (Logic of the Human Sciences, 1920)
 Die Schichten der Persönlichkeit, 1938
 Mensch und Geschichte, 1944
 Probleme der Kulturanthropologie (Problems of the Anthropology  of Culture, 1948)

External links 
 
 

20th-century German philosophers
1888 births
1965 deaths
German male writers